Yordan Filipov (18 June 1946 - 27 July 1996) was a Bulgarian footballer who played as a goalkeeper. He was maternal grandfather of Andrey Galabinov. 
In his career Filipov played for Rozova Dolina, Spartak Plovdiv, CSKA Sofia, Sliven, Dunav Ruse and Cherno More Varna, with whom he became the oldest player to appear in the Bulgarian A Group. Filipov played his last career game on 26 November 1988 at Ticha Stadium against Lokomotiv Plovdiv at 42 years, 5 months and 8 days.

Between 1965 and 1980 Filipov won eight A Group titles and four Bulgarian Cups with CSKA, playing 188 league matches.

Honours

Club
CSKA Sofia
 A Group (8): 1965–66, 1968–69, 1970–71, 1971–72, 1972–73, 1974–75, 1975–76, 1979–80
 Bulgarian Cup (4): 1969, 1972, 1973, 1974 
 
Rabat Ajax 
Maltese Premier League (1) : 1984–85 
 Euro Cup (1) : 1984–85

References

External links
 

1946 births
1996 deaths
Bulgarian footballers
Bulgaria international footballers
Association football goalkeepers
FC Spartak Plovdiv players
PFC CSKA Sofia players
OFC Sliven 2000 players
FC Dunav Ruse players
PFC Cherno More Varna players
First Professional Football League (Bulgaria) players